Toto in Color (Italian: Totò a colori) is a 1952 Italian comedy film, and was the first Italian color film shot with the Ferraniacolor system. The film was directed by Steno and starred the comic actor Totò.

Plot
Antonio Scannagatti is a penniless musician who lives with his sister's family in the small town of Caianello. He dreams of a call from either the Milanese music publishers Tiscordi or Zozzogno (puns of Ricordi and Sonzogno) to guarantee him glory: he is in fact convinced to be a musical genius, calling himself "the Swan of Caianello".

One day the mayor is organizing a celebration for the Italian-American gangster Joe Pellecchia, originally from Caianello, and asks Scannagatti to direct the town’s musical band in place of maestro Tiburzio, who suffered a sudden paralysis. Feeling outraged by the proposal he deemed unworthy of his perceived talent, Scannagatti reluctantly accepts when the mayor’s nephew Poldo, lying, promises him a recommendation from the publisher Tiscordi, passing off his American girlfriend Poppy as Tiscordi’s secretary.

The day of celebration turns out to be a failure: Pellecchia would like to give a speech from the balcony of the town hall, but Scannagatti inadvertently prevents him by making the band play continuously one of his own opera, until the Italian-American gets mad and goes away. A day later Scannagatti still goes to collect his prize – the coveted recommendation – and joins Poldo and Poppy, who have left Caianello and are guests of a bizarre company in Capri. There, the couple tricks him again by making him believe to have get an appointment with Tiscordi.
Scannagatti therefore takes a sleeping car ticket for Milan. After a night trip spent arguing with his bunk mate, the Honourable Cosimo Trombetta, he finally arrives in Milan and meets Tiscordi in person due to a misunderstanding: he has been mistaken for a nurse able to give painless injections to the editor, who has already fired numerous nurses. The misunderstanding leads to an altercation between the two.

The misadventures are not over: Scannagatti is intercepted by his Sicilian brother-in-law – whose money he has stolen for the trip to Milan – who threatens to kill him; to appease him, the maestro pretends to have obtained a contract from Tiscordi and takes him to the stage, but of a teatro dei pupi. At first Scannagatti manages to deceive his relative by pretending to be a Pinocchio puppet and dancing on the theme of Parade of the Wooden Soldiers, but at the end of the show the brother-in-law recognizes him and pursues him with the knife. Surprisingly, by chance Tiscordi reads one of the scores left in his office by Scannagatti and is delighted by it: in the end, the whole town of Caianello – brother-in-law included – pays homage to his "Swan".

Cast

Production
Totò in Color was essentially an anthology of Totò's most famous comedy sketches and mime performance (the dancing Pinocchio puppet who collapses as soon as the music ends, the simulated fireworks during the ending scene). According to Steno, directing the film was basically like leaving the movie camera directly in Totò's hands, whose timing had been made perfect by years and years of performing the sketches in front of the public.

The movie was shot with the Ferraniacolor system, which required an extremely powerful lighting; this was especially painful for Totò – already suffering to the eyes – and is credited for accelerating his loss of vision.

"The Honourable in sleeping car" (Italian: "L'Onorevole in vagone letto") has been called Totò's most famous sketch. It originated in 1947 and replica after replica it was expanded until assuming its final iteration in Totò in Color. It was inspired by a real encounter between Totò and Giulio Andreotti who by chance found themselves sharing the same sleeping car, as well as a few puns. Film director Walter Veltroni considered it "perhaps the most sensational comedy sketch in the history of Italian cinema".

Reception
Totò in Color is widely regarded as Totò's masterpiece. Film critic Morando Morandini gave the film four stars out of five.

The film has been chosen as one of the 100 Italian films to be saved.

References

External links
  

1952 films
1950s Italian-language films
Italian comedy films
Films set in Campania
Films set in Milan
Films produced by Dino De Laurentiis
1952 comedy films
1950s Italian films